The 2017–18 Ukrainian Hockey League season was the 26th season of the Ukrainian Hockey Championship. Six teams participated in the league this season, and HC Donbass won the championship.

Regular season

Play-off

Bracket

Quarter-finals 
Dynamo Kharkiv – Halytski Levy 6:5 (2:2, 4:3)
HC Kremenchuk – Vovky Brovary 10:4 (5:1, 5:3)

Semi-finals 
HC Donbass – Dynamo Kharkiv 3:0 (6:2, 9:0, 9:2)
Bilyi Bars – HC Kremenchuk 0:3 (1:2 OT, 3:5, 4:5 OT)

Final 
HC Donbass – HC Kremenchuk 4:1 (3:0, 6:3, 3:4, 5:2, 3:0)

References

Ukrainian Hockey Championship seasons
Ukrainian Hockey Championship
Ukr